Eastside is a neighborhood in Paterson, New Jersey, United States. It is bordered by South Paterson, Downtown Paterson, Riverside and the Passaic River  It is bound by 10th Avenue and Montgomery Street to the north, Straight Street to the west, I-80 to the south and the river to the east.  It is Paterson's largest neighborhood and includes the smaller neighborhoods of Sandy Hill, People's Park, Eastside Park Historic District and the Manor Section.  Eastside is a mostly residential area with commercial centers along 33rd Street and Broadway.  It is also home to Eastside Park, Paterson's largest park.

Sandy Hill

Sandy Hill is a neighborhood  located roughly west of Madison Avenue, north of Cedar Street, south of Market Street and east of Straight Street. Due to Paterson's significant population turn-over, this neighborhood is now home to a large Hispanic community, mostly first-generation Dominicans. The Sandy Hill section of Paterson is located in the city's 5th Ward. Roberto Clemente Park, which was originally known as Sandy Hill Park is located in this neighborhood.

References

Neighborhoods in Paterson, New Jersey